Silene flos-cuculi (syn. Lychnis flos-cuculi), commonly called ragged-robin, is a perennial herbaceous plant in the family Caryophyllaceae. This species is native to Europe and Asia, where it is found along roads and in wet meadows and pastures. In Britain it has declined in numbers because of modern farming techniques and draining of wet-lands and is no longer common. However, it has become naturalized in parts of the northern United States and eastern Canada.

Description

Silene flos-cuculi forms a rosette of low growing foliage with numerous flower stems 20 to 90 cm tall. The stems rise above the foliage and branch near the top of the stem and end with the pink flowers which are 3–4 cm across. The flowers have five narrow petals deeply divided into four lobes giving the flower an untidy, ragged appearance, hence its common name. The calyx tube is five-toothed with ten stamens. The leaves are paired, with the lower leaves spoon-shaped and stalked. The middle and upper leaves are linear-lanceolate with pointed apexes. All of the leaves are untoothed. The stems have barbed hairs pointing downward and these hairs make the plant rough to the touch. Ragged Robins bloom from May to August, occasionally later, and butterflies and long-tongued bees feed on the flowers' nectar. In addition to these pollinators, the flowers are visited by many types of insects, and can be characterized by a generalized pollination syndrome. The fruits consist of small (6–10 mm) capsules opening on top by five teeth and containing many small seeds, they are found on the plants from August onwards.

Cultivation
Popular garden cultivars include:
'Alba' – white-flowered form
='Lychjen' 
'Nana' – dwarf form (4 inches) with smaller leaf rosettes and shorter flower stems
'Petite Jenny' 
'White Robin'

References

flos-cuculi
Flora of Europe
Flora of Asia
Plants described in 1753
Taxa named by Carl Linnaeus